Forever Again is the second full-length album by the Canadian indie band Eric's Trip. The album was recorded and mixed by the band's guitarist, Rick White. Sessions for the album took place at band members' homes and at White's home studio, Stereo Mountain. It was released by Seattle's Sub Pop records as SP 268, in LP, CD and cassette formats.

The album documents the romantic parting of White and Julie Doiron, as well as White's issues with drug use.

The first few hundred copies of the vinyl LP ordered by mail-order included a bonus 7-inch EP with a comic book sleeve titled Notes From Stereo Mountain.  The EP is one of the rarest items in the Eric's Trip catalog.

Critical reception
Trouser Press called the album better than the debut, writing that "the songwriting tightens some of the eighteen selections into shapely forms, most noticeably when acoustic lightness is the chosen timbre."

Track listing
 "New Love"  – 2:59
 "This Way Out"  – 1:08
 "About You"  – 1:22
 "Girlfriend"  – 2:19
 "Always There"  – 1:53
 "Stupidest Thing"  – 1:52
 "December '93"  – 2:08
 "Thoroughly"  – 1:14
 "My Bed Is Red"  – 4:47
 "View Master"  – 2:46
 "Cloudy"  – 1:40
 "My Chest Is Empty"  – 3:07
 "Run Away"  – 1:42
 "Waiting All Day"  – 2:51
 "Let Go"  – 1:45
 "Hate Song"  – 1:33
 "Feeling Around"  – 2:36
 "Forever Again"  – 3:51

Personnel
Julie Doiron - bass, vocals
Mark Gaudet - drums
Chris Thompson - guitars
Rick White - guitar, vocals

References

1994 albums
Eric's Trip albums
Sub Pop albums